Bumbunga may refer to:
 Bumbunga, South Australia
 Lake Bumbunga, South Australia
 Province of Bumbunga, historic micronation in South Australia